James Smith Page (born 1953) is an Australian educationist and anthropologist, and a recognised authority within the field of peace education.

Education
Page holds a BA (Honours) degree from Griffith University, a Bachelor of Divinity degree from the University of Queensland, a Graduate Diploma in Education from Charles Sturt University, a Master of Education (Honours) degree from the University of New England, and a PhD degree from Southern Cross University.

Professional career
Page has taught in secondary teaching, peace and conflict studies,  and teacher education. He was a member of the International Year for the Culture of Peace Taskforce within the UNESCO Secretariat in Paris, and a member of GIPGAP (Group on International Perspectives on Governmental Aggression and Peace), examining social attitudes to peace and war. Page is currently an adjunct professor with the University of New England, Australia.

Critical recognition
 Joint winner Banjo Paterson Writing Award
 Fellow of the Australian Anthropological Society
 Recipient of the IER Award for Outstanding Educational Research
 Recognition by the Director-General of UNESCO
 Nominee for the UNESCO-Madanjeet Singh Prize
 Recipient of the United Nations Queensland Award
 Joint winner of the WSFBPC Peace Essay Contest

External links
 Expert Guide Listing
 UNE staff page
 Essays with Online Opinion
 Online publications with QUT
 Online publications with UNE

Select bibliography 
 Page, J.S. (2020) 'Philosophy of Peace'. Internet Encyclopedia of Philosophy. .
 Page, J.S. (2014) 'Peace Education'. In: D. Phillips (ed.) Encyclopedia of Educational Theory and Philosophy. (597-599). Thousand Oaks: Sage Publications
 Page, J.S. et alia (2013) 'Definitions of peace and reconciliation in Great Britain, Northern Ireland, Canada, the United States, and Australia', In: K. Malley-Morrison, A. Mercurio, and G. Twose (eds.) International Handbook of Peace and Reconciliation. (35-49). NY: Springer.
 Page, J.S. et alia (2013) 'Perspectives on invasion: Great Britain, Northern Ireland, United States, Canada and Australia'. In: K. Malley-Morrison, S. McCarthy, and K. Hines (eds.)  International Handbook on War, Torture and Terrorism. (359-379). NY: Springer. 
 Page, J.S. (2010) ‘Peace Education’. In: E. Baker, B. McGaw, and P. Peterson (eds.) International Encyclopedia of Education. Volume 1. (850–854). Oxford: Elsevier.
 Page, J.S.(2009) ‘Chapter 7: Australia’. In: Kathleen Malley-Morrison (ed.) State Violence and the Right to Peace. Volume 4. (137–155, 280–281). Santa Barbara: Praeger Security International.
 Page, J.S. (2008) Peace Education: Exploring Ethical and Philosophical Foundations. Charlotte: Information Age Publishing.
 Page, J.S. (2008) ‘Chapter 9: The United Nations and Peace Education’. In: Monisha Bajaj (ed.) Encyclopedia of Peace Education. (75–83). Charlotte: Information Age Publishing.
 Page, J.S. (2008) ‘Philosophy of Peace Education’.  In: Monisha Bajaj (ed.) Online Encyclopedia of Peace Education. New York: Columbia University, Teachers College. Available online.

References

1953 births
20th-century Australian educators
Australian anthropologists
Australian educational theorists
Living people
People from Brisbane
University of Queensland alumni
Griffith University alumni
University of New England (Australia) alumni
Charles Sturt University alumni
Southern Cross University alumni